Fandry Imbiri (born 5 April 1992) is an Indonesian professional footballer who plays as a defender for Liga 1 club Persita Tangerang, on loan from club  Persik Kediri.

Club career

Persipura Jayapura
After training with junior teams in his native Papua (province), Imbiri in 2013 joined the province's top club Persipura Jayapura when it was a dominant force in the Indonesian Super League, the top-tier of Indonesian football. However, he only could earn four playing chances in two years.

Semen Padang
Imbiri in 2016 left his home province to play for Semen Padang FC, a top-tier club in West Sumatra on the other side of the country. It was here that he earned his early playing time with 21 appearances, including in the 2016 Indonesia Soccer Championship A.

Persebaya Surabaya
His performance at Semen Padang caught the attention of Liga 2 club, Persebaya Surabaya, which was striving to return to top-flight football. Imbiri was an integral part of the Persebaya team that won the 2017 Liga 2 and earned promotion to Liga 1 (Indonesia).

Madura United
After a year in Liga 1 with Persebaya, Imbiri signed for Madura United to play in the 2019 Liga 1 season. However, Imbiri struggled to secure a starting position in the backline with only 10 appearances in two years.

PSS Sleman
Imbiri in 2021 joined Liga 1 club PSS Sleman as part of team upgrading after the change of ownership. He made his league debut on 1 November 2021 in a match against Borneo.

Persik Kediri
Imbiri was signed for Persik Kediri to play in Liga 1 in the 2022–23 season.

Honours

Club
Persebaya Surabaya
 Liga 2: 2017

 PSS Sleman

 Menpora Cup third place: 2021

References

External links
 Fandry Imbiri at Soccerway
 Fandry Imbiri at Liga Indonesia

1991 births
Living people
Papuan people
Indonesian footballers
People from Jayapura
Liga 1 (Indonesia) players
Liga 2 (Indonesia) players
Persipura Jayapura players
Semen Padang F.C. players
Persebaya Surabaya players
Madura United F.C. players
PSS Sleman players
Persik Kediri players
Association football central defenders
Sportspeople from Papua
Indonesia youth international footballers